Dig Out the Switch is the debut album of Dazzling Killmen, released in 1992 through Intellectual Convulsion.

Track listing

Personnel 
Dazzling Killmen
Blake Fleming – drums
Darin Gray – bass guitar
Nick Sakes – guitar, vocals
Production and additional personnel
Steve Albini – recording
Jeff Tweedy – production
Miles Rutlin – painting

References

External links 
 

1992 debut albums
Albums produced by Jeff Tweedy
Dazzling Killmen albums